The discography of Big Daddy Kane, an American rapper, consists of seven studio albums and fourteen singles.

Studio albums

Singles

As lead artist

Guest appearances

References

Notes

Citations

Hip hop discographies
Discographies of American artists